Ethmia cirrhocnemia is a moth in the family Depressariidae. It is found in the southern Ural, the Caucasus, Iran, Turkestan, southern Yenisei, Irkutsk, Mongolia, Transbaikal, China (Mien-shan) and Korea.

Adults have been recorded from mid-May to late July.

References

Moths described in 1870
cirrhocnemia